Meall Buidhe (946 m) is a mountain in the Northwest Highlands, Scotland. It lies on the Knoydart peninsula in Lochaber.

A rocky mountain, Meall Buidhe is one of three Munros on Knoydart, and presents a challenging peak to climb from all directions. The nearest village is Inverie.

References

Mountains and hills of the Northwest Highlands
Marilyns of Scotland
Munros